NA-220 Hyderabad-II is a constituency for the National Assembly of Pakistan.

Members of Parliament

2018-2022: NA-226 (Hyderabad-II)

Election 2002 

General elections were held on 10 Oct 2002. Prof. Khalid Wahab of Muttahida Qaumi Movement won by 36,755 votes.

Election 2008 

General elections were held on 18 Feb 2008. Syed Tayyab Hussain of Muttahida Qaumi Movement won by 168,136 votes.

Election 2013 

General elections were held on 11 May 2013. Dr. Khalid Maqbool Siddiqui of Muttahida Qaumi Movement won by 141,035 votes and became the  member of National Assembly.

Election 2018 

General elections were held on 25 July 2018.

†MQM-P is considered heir apparent to MQM

See also
NA-219 Hyderabad-I
NA-221 Hyderabad-III

References

External links 
Election result's official website

NA-219